Zafaran-e Sofla (also Romanized as Za‘farān-e Soflá; also known as Seyyedmā) is a village in Mansuri Rural District, Homeyl District, Eslamabad-e Gharb County, Kermanshah Province, Iran. There were 8 families and 40 people there according to the 2006 Census.

References 

Populated places in Eslamabad-e Gharb County